The right and left  paratracheal lymph nodes (or paratracheal chains) are groups of lymph nodes located in the throat.

External links
 http://www.emedicine.com/ent/topic306.htm#section~anatomy_of_the_cervical_lymphatics

Lymphatics of the head and neck